Cristiano André was the Chief Justice of the Supreme Court of Angola from 1997 to 2014.

References

Living people
Year of birth missing (living people)
Place of birth missing (living people)
Chief justices
Angolan judges